Michael Jeremy Bates (born 19 June 1962) is a British former professional tennis player. He was ranked UK number 1 in 1987 and from 1989 to 1994. He reached a career-high ATP world ranking of 54 from 17 April 1995 to 23 April 1995.

During his career Bates won two Grand Slam mixed doubles titles, at Wimbledon in 1987 and the Australian Open in 1991, partnering his fellow British player Jo Durie. He also won one top-level singles title and three men's doubles titles on the professional circuit. After retiring as a player, Bates served as the captain of Britain's Davis Cup team from 2004 to 2006.

Career
Bates turned professional in 1982. Partnering his fellow British player Jo Durie, he won the mixed doubles titles at Wimbledon in 1987, the first British doubles team to win the title for 51 years and the Australian Open in 1991, the first time a British doubles team has ever won the title. He was also a Men's Doubles runner-up at the Australian Open in 1988 (partnering Sweden's Peter Lundgren).

As a singles player, Bates reached the fourth round at Wimbledon twice – in 1992 and 1994 – losing on both occasions to France's Guy Forget. In the 1992 encounter, Bates held a match point against Forget in the fourth set, but failed to convert it and ended up losing in five sets 7–6, 4–6, 6–3, 6–7, 3–6, narrowly missing out on a place in the quarter-finals against John McEnroe. Bates was also the first ever opponent of Andre Agassi in the main draw of a Grand Slam tournament, in the first round of the 1986 US Open, with Bates winning in four sets against the 16-year-old wildcard Agassi.

Bates won one top-level singles title during his career – at Seoul in 1994 when he was aged 31, becoming the first British male to win an ATP tour title since 1977 (he was the oldest champion on the tour that season). He also won three men's doubles titles at Tel Aviv (1989), Queen's Club (1990), and Rotterdam (1994). He was the British national champion six times, and played in 20 Davis Cup ties for Britain, scoring 27 wins and 24 losses. His career-high rankings were World No. 54 in singles (in 1995) and World No. 25 in doubles (in 1991).

Grand Slam finals

Doubles: 1 (1 loss)

Mixed doubles: 2 (2 wins)

ATP Career Finals

Singles: 1 (1 title)

Doubles: 11 (3 titles, 8 runner-ups)

ATP Challenger and ITF Futures finals

Singles: 10 (5–5)

Doubles: 7 (5–2)

Performance timelines

Singles

Doubles

Mixed Doubles

Post-retirement activity

Bates retired from the professional tour in 1996. Since leaving the tour, he has served as captain of Britain's Davis Cup team as well as playing in seniors' events. He quit as Head of Performance for the Lawn Tennis Association in January 2007. In September 2007, Bates was appointed Director of Tennis at the Sutton Tennis Academy (London, UK). He quit Sutton Tennis Academy in May 2010, and worked as a broadcaster and commentator for the BBC, Eurosport and Sky. He became the individual coach of former British Number 1 Anne Keothavong and continues to coach, including British player, Katie Boulter. He is also a motivational speaker on team building.

References

External links
 
 
 

 

1962 births
Australian Open (tennis) champions
English male tennis players
Hopman Cup competitors
Living people
Sportspeople from Solihull
Tennis people from Greater London
Tennis players at the 1988 Summer Olympics
Wimbledon champions
Grand Slam (tennis) champions in mixed doubles
British male tennis players
Olympic tennis players of Great Britain